is a Japanese politician of the Democratic Party of Japan, a member of the House of Councillors in the Diet (national legislature). A native of Kyoto Prefecture, he was elected for the first time in 1996.

References

External links 
 Official website in Japanese.

Members of the House of Representatives (Japan)
Members of the House of Councillors (Japan)
Politicians from Kyoto Prefecture
Living people
1960 births
Democratic Party of Japan politicians